The UCPH Department of Nutrition, Exercise and Sports is a department under the Faculty of Science at University of Copenhagen (UCPH). It has facilities both at the university's North Campus and Frederiksberg Campus.

History

The department's predecessor, the Institute of Exercise and Sport Sciences, was established in September 1997 through the consolidation of the former Laboratory for Human Physiology, the August Krogh Institute, and the Centre for Sports Research (Center for Idrætsforskning), all parts of the University of Copenhagen, and the formerly independent Danish State Institute of Physical Education (Danmarks Højskole for Legemsøvelser).

References

External links

University of Copenhagen